Gerri Hall (born August 2, 1934) is an American R&B singer known for her works with Huey "Piano" Smith and the Clowns.

Life and career 
Gerri Hall was born Erdine Bouise in New Orleans, Louisiana. An African, Spanish, and American Indian descent, Hall was a big fan of comedian Jerry Lewis from whom she named herself after. Her surname Hall comes from her ex-husband, who was the brother of Rosemary Hall Domino, the wife of Fats Domino.

Hall was working as a waitress at the famed club Dew Drop Inn where she met Huey Smith and Bobby Marchan. They invited her to join the Clowns in 1957. From then on, Hall served as one of the key members of the golden days of the Clowns singing on songs including “Don’t You Just Know It”. She also recorded with Huey Smith under the duo name of ‘’Huey and Jerry’’.

Apart from her work with Smith, Hall took part in Earl King’s Imperial Records session doing backing vocals on two tracks "Don't You Lose It" and "Don't Cry My Friend" in 1962. These songs were released under its subsidiary label Post as a single. Hall also did some live dates with Benny Spellman and Smiley Lewis in New Orleans.

As a solo artist, she released some singles in the 1950s to 1960s, and in 1966, she appeared on the TV Show “The !!!! Beat” hosted by Hoss Allen. The single “I Cried a Tear” from the RAI label she released in 1966 was leased to Atco Records for a wider distribution.

Later, she gave up her solo career and joined Ray Charles’ Raelettes.

She performed as a member of the Clowns at the Tipitina’s in May, 1981, the show that’s considered the last Clowns live appearance to date. Apparently, she has not been performing much if any after this show, but she has appeared as a panelist for the conference sessions at Ponderosa Stomp in New Orleans in 2010 and 2011.

Discography

Singles

Compilations

References

External links 
 Ponderosa Stomp: Gerri Hall
 An interview video with Rick Coleman from 2010 Ponderosa Stomp

Rhythm and blues musicians from New Orleans
Living people
Ace Records (United States) artists
20th-century African-American women singers
American women singers
American rhythm and blues singers
Contemporary blues musicians
American blues singers
Blues musicians from Louisiana
Singers from Louisiana
21st-century African-American women
1934 births
Huey "Piano" Smith and His Clowns members